Samuel Awuku ) is a Ghanaian politician who was Deputy Communications Director, National Youth Organiser and currently the National Organiser of the New Patriotic Party (NPP). He is also the board chairman of the National Youth Employment Agency (YEA). In 2021, he was appointed as the Director General of the National Lottery Authority.

Birth 
Sammi is the only son among four sisters and the last born of his parents. He was born and raised in Koforidua, in the Eastern Region of Ghana.

Education 
Sammi had his basic education at Nana Kwaku Boateng Experimental School. He continued his secondary education at St. Augustine's College in Cape Coast and later read Political science and Psychology at the University of Ghana, Legon. Sammi holds a Diploma in Law from the University of London and is currently pursuing a master's degree in International relations at the Free University of Berlin in Germany. He  has also earned a Diploma of Higher Education in Law from the University of London and an Executive Education Certificate in Public Leadership from the Kennedy School of Government in Harvard University,USA. He  holds  Postgraduate Certificates in Public Administration and Advertising, Marketing and Public Relations from the Ghana Institute of Management and Public Administration (GIMPA) and the Ghana Institute of Journalism respectively.

Personal life 
Sammi is married to Mary Anane, with three daughters.

Political career 
While at the University of Ghana, Sammi was a member of the political community, contesting for the presidency of the Student Representative Council.

From 2011 to 2013, he worked at the Communications Directorate of the New Patriotic Party, assisting then Director of Communications, Nana Akomea, before his election as National Youth Organiser in April 2014.

During 2012 Election Petition hearing at the Supreme Court of Ghana, Sammi was charged with contempt of the highest court of the land. He was pardoned after pleading guilty and showing remorse.

As National Youth Organiser, Sammi played a vital role in mobilizing the youth leading to NPP's victory in the 2016 Ghanaian general election.

In 2016, Sammi was number five among fifty most Influential Young Ghanaians ranking.

Sammi is currently the CEO of the National Lottery Authority.

Other roles 
He is a Director at the Brain Hill International School and was a Director of Strategy and Innovation at the April–June Company Limited in Accra until 2021. He has been on the  Board of the Accra City Hotel since 2017.He has been the Vice Chairman of the International Young Democrats Union (IYDU) for three terms.It is an international association of the youth wings of conservative parties worldwide.

Philanthropy 
In May 2022, Sammi donated an amount of GHc50,000 for the construction of the chief palace at Adawso.

References 

Living people
University of Ghana alumni
1984 births
People from Koforidua
New Patriotic Party politicians
St. Augustine's College (Cape Coast) alumni
Akan people